Arcade is a comune  in the province of Treviso, Veneto, northern Italy.

Twin towns
 Bernières-sur-Mer, France, since 2011

References

Cities and towns in Veneto